Hyphalophis devius is a species of eel in the family Ophichthidae. It is the only member of its genus. It is found in the waters off of Grenada and the Lesser Antilles.

References

Ophichthidae
Fish described in 1982